This article lists the deputy heads of state of Yugoslavia.

List

See also
List of heads of state of Yugoslavia
President of Serbia and Montenegro

References

Vice President of Yugoslavia
Deputy Heads of State
Yugoslavia